Ukraine first competed at the 1993 World Championships, after the fall of the Soviet Union.  Despite being very successful in the team events as the Soviet Union, Ukrainian athletes have primarily had individual success at the World Championships.  The Chinese women originally won the bronze medal in the team event at the 1999 World Championships; however their medal was stripped in 2010 after it was discovered that Dong Fangxiao's age was falsified at the time of the competition.  The Ukrainian women's team, who originally finished fourth, was then awarded the bronze medal.

Medalists

Medal tables

By gender

By event

Junior World medalists

See also 
 Ukraine men's national artistic gymnastics team
 Ukraine women's national artistic gymnastics team
 List of Olympic male artistic gymnasts for Ukraine
 List of Olympic female artistic gymnasts for Ukraine

References 

World Artistic Gymnastics Championships
Gymnastics in Ukraine